Terence Henry Irwin FBA (born 21 April 1947), usually cited as T. H. Irwin, is a scholar and philosopher specializing in ancient Greek philosophy and the history of ethics (i.e., the history of Western moral philosophy in ancient, medieval, and modern times). He was the Professor of the History of Philosophy at the University of Oxford, and Fellow of Keble College, Oxford, from 2007 until 2017.

Education and career
Irwin was an undergraduate at Magdalen College, Oxford, where he graduated with a BA (first-class honours) in Literae Humaniores (Classics, Philosophy and Ancient History) in 1969. He then studied at Princeton University with Gregory Vlastos, and graduated with a PhD in Philosophy in 1973. He was Assistant Professor of Philosophy at Harvard University (1972–1975) and then, from 1975 until 2007, he was at Cornell University, where he served as Susan Linn Sage Professor of Philosophy and Humane Letters (from 1995), Professor of Classics (from 1992), and Professor of Philosophy (from 1982). He moved to Oxford in 2007, and retired in 2017.

Irwin is a Fellow of both the American Academy of Arts and Sciences and the British Academy. He is married to Gail Fine, professor of philosophy at Cornell University and visiting professor of ancient philosophy at Oxford.

Publications
Plato's Moral Theory. Oxford: Oxford University Press, 1977. 
Plato's Gorgias (translation and notes). Oxford: Oxford University Press, 1979. 
Aristotle's Nicomachean Ethics (translation and notes). Indianapolis: Hackett Publishing Company, 1985. 
Aristotle's First Principles. Oxford: Oxford University Press, 1988. 
Classical Thought. OPUS Series. Oxford: Oxford University Press, 1988. 
Plato's Ethics. Oxford: Oxford University Press, 1995. 
The Development of Ethics, Vol. 1 (from Socrates to the Reformation). Oxford: Oxford University Press, 2007. 
The Development of Ethics, Vol. 2 (from Suarez to Rousseau). Oxford: Oxford University Press, 2008. 
The Development of Ethics, Vol. 3 (from Kant to Rawls). Oxford: Oxford University Press, 2009. 

In addition, Irwin has published over 100 essays and articles in journals and volumes of conference proceedings.

Notes

External links
 Terence Irwin’s home page at the University of Oxford’s Faculty of Philosophy
 Terence Irwin’s home page at Keble College, Oxford

1947 births
Living people
Harvard University faculty
Cornell University faculty
British scholars of ancient Greek philosophy
Irish philosophers
Fellows of Keble College, Oxford
Fellows of the British Academy